This is a list of South Korean models.

A
 Ahn Jae-Hyun

C
 Choi Han-bit
 Choi Ji-woo
 Choi Soo-young

H
 Harisu
 Daniel Henney

I
 Im Yoona

J
 Jun Ji-hyun

K
 Daul Kim
 Kim Tae-hee
 Yu-ri Kim
 Kwon Sang-woo
 Kim Kyu Jong
 Ku Hye Sun

L
 Lee Pa-ni
 Lee Sa-bi
 Lee Sung-kyung
 Lee Soo-hyuk
 Soo Yeon Lee

O
 Oh Yoon-ah

P
 Hye-rim Park

S
 Song Yun-ah

W
 Woo Seung-yeon

Y
 Yi Hong

See also

List of people of Korean descent
Contemporary culture of South Korea

 
Models, South Korean
Korean